Sadhu Singh may refer to:
 Sadhu Singh, MP from Punjab
 Sadhu Singh (athlete)  
 Sadhu Singh Dharamsot, Congress politician
 Sadhu Singh Hamdard, Punjabi poet
 Sadhu Singh Thind (born 1972), Indian musician
 Sandhu Singh Gurbir